Ó Dubhagáinn was the name of a bardic family  from Baile Uí Dhubhagáin, in Uí Maine, (now Ballyduggan, Loughrea, County Galway). The family were not related to similarly named family of Dugan of Fermoy, County Cork.

The name is now generally rendered as Dugan.

Bearers of the name
 Seán Mór Ó Dubhagáin (died 1372), Irish poet and historian
 Tomás Bacach Ó Dúgáin (fl. 1848-1858), scribe
 Maolsheachlainn Ó Dúgáin (fl. mid-19th century), scribe
 Liam Ó Dúgáin (fl. mid-19th century), scribe
 John Doogan (1853–1940), Irish recipient of the Victoria Cross
 Winston Dugan, 1st Baron Dugan of Victoria (1876-1951), son of a Dugan of County Galway
 Richard E. Duggan (b. 1952), artist/designer
 Michael Dugan (b. 1937), General

References
 http://www.irishtimes.com/ancestor/surname/index.cfm?fuseaction=Go.&UserID=

Surnames
Surnames of Irish origin
Irish families
Irish Brehon families
Irish-language surnames
Families of Irish ancestry